The following highways are numbered 145:

Australia
  Lower Barrington Road, Paloona Road, Melrose Road, Bellamy Road, Forthside Road (Tasmania)
  Inverleigh–Winchelsea Road (Victoria)

Canada
 Winnipeg Route 145
 New Brunswick Route 145
 Prince Edward Island Route 145

Costa Rica
 National Route 145

Japan
 Japan National Route 145
 Fukuoka Prefectural Route 145
 Nara Prefectural Route 145

Malaysia
 Malaysia Federal Route 145

United States
 Alabama State Route 145
 Arkansas Highway 145
 California State Route 145
 County Route 145 (California)
 Colorado State Highway 145
 Connecticut Route 145
 Florida State Road 145
 County Road 145 (Hamilton County, Florida)
 Georgia State Route 145
 Hawaii Route 145
 Illinois Route 145
 Indiana State Road 145
 Iowa Highway 145 (former)
 Kentucky Route 145
 Louisiana Highway 145
 Maine State Route 145
 Maryland Route 145
 Massachusetts Route 145
 M-145 (Michigan highway) (former)
 Mississippi Highway 145
 Missouri Route 145
 New Hampshire Route 145
 New Mexico State Road 145
 New York State Route 145
 County Route 145 (Broome County, New York)
 County Route 145 (Fulton County, New York)
 County Route 145 (Herkimer County, New York)
 County Route 145 (Rensselaer County, New York)
 County Route 145 (Schenectady County, New York)
 North Carolina Highway 145
 Ohio State Route 145
 Oklahoma State Highway 145
 Pennsylvania Route 145
 South Carolina Highway 145
 Tennessee State Route 145
 Texas State Highway 145 (former)
 Texas State Highway Loop 145
 Texas State Highway Spur 145 (former)
 Farm to Market Road 145
 Utah State Route 145
 Utah State Route 145 (1933-1969) (former)
 Virginia State Route 145
 Wisconsin Highway 145

Territories
 Puerto Rico Highway 145